Arthrobacter luteolus is a bacterium species from the genus Arthrobacter which has been isolated from a human surgical wound in Belgium.
Arthrobacter luteolus occurs in human clinical specimens.

References

Further reading

External links
Type strain of Arthrobacter luteolus at BacDive -  the Bacterial Diversity Metadatabase

Bacteria described in 2000
Psychrophiles
Micrococcaceae